Xialuhe Korean Ethnic Township, also known as Haroha Korean Ethnic Township, is an ethnic township in Kuandian Manchu Autonomous County, Dandong, Liaoning Province, China.

History 
Throughout the 1920s on through the 1940s, the area of present-day Xialuhe was a hotbed of Korean independence armies, who often sparred with occupying Japanese forces.

In 1958, Xialuhe Township was created. Xialuhe was re-designated from a township to an ethnic township in 1987.

Administrative divisions 
Xialuhe is divided into 6 administrative villages.

 Majiazi/Magaja
 Lianjiang
 Tongjiang/Tonggang
 Chuangou/Cheongu()
 Shuanglian
 Shuangguang

Demographics 
Xialuhe Korean Ethnic Township has a population of 10,887 as of 2018.

As of 2010, the ethnic township had a population of 10,370, of which there are 5,371 males and 4,999 females. That year, there were 1,327 people aged 14 and under, 7,941 people aged 15 to 64, and 1,102 people aged 65 and up.

A 2009 estimate placed Xialuhe's population at about 11,200.

As of 2007, there were approximately 1,100 ethnic Koreans living in Xialuhe, however, Xialuhe's ethnic Korean population has declined in recent years, largely due to low birth rates, migration to urban areas, and emigration to South Korea. By the 2010s, a local Korean language newspaper reported that many schoolchildren in Xialuhe cannot speak Korean.

Education 
Since the establishment of the People's Republic of China, a number of bilingual schools teaching in both Mandarin Chinese and Korean have been established in Xialuhe. However, due to the decline in the local ethnic Korean population, a number of these schools have been closed or merged in recent years.

References 

Township-level divisions of Jilin
Dandong
Ethnic townships of the People's Republic of China
Korean diaspora in China